Aspatharia is a genus of freshwater mussel, an aquatic bivalve mollusk in the family Iridinidae.

Species
Species within the genus Aspatharia include:
 Aspatharia chaiziana
 Aspatharia dahomeyensis
 Aspatharia divaricata
 Aspatharia droueti
 Aspatharia marnoi
 Aspatharia pangallensis
 Aspatharia pfeifferiana
 Aspatharia rochebrunei
 Aspatharia rugifera
 Aspatharia semicorrugata
 Aspatharia subreniformis

References

Unionida
Bivalve genera
Taxonomy articles created by Polbot
Taxa named by Jules René Bourguignat